Klára Rajnai (born November 21, 1953) is a Hungarian sprint canoer who competed in the mid to late 1970s. She won two medals at the 1976 Summer Olympics in Montreal with a silver in the K-2 500 m and a bronze in the K-1 500 m events.

Rajnai also won two bronze medals at the ICF Canoe Sprint World Championships with one in the K-1 500 m (1979) and one in the K-4 500 m (1975 event.

References

Sports-reference.com profile

1953 births
Canoeists at the 1976 Summer Olympics
Hungarian female canoeists
Living people
Olympic canoeists of Hungary
Olympic silver medalists for Hungary
Olympic bronze medalists for Hungary
Olympic medalists in canoeing
ICF Canoe Sprint World Championships medalists in kayak
Medalists at the 1976 Summer Olympics